Black Venus (also published as Saints and Strangers) is a collection of short fiction by Angela Carter. It was first published in the United Kingdom in 1985 by Chatto & Windus Ltd. and contains eight stories, the majority of which are concerned with re-imagining the lives of certain figures in history, with a particular emphasis on some well known through literature.

The "Black Venus" of the title story is Jeanne Duval, the lover of poet Charles Baudelaire. The anthology's contents are also reprinted in the volume Burning Your Boats, which features all of Carter's short fiction.

Contents
 “Black Venus”
 “The Kiss”
 “Our Lady of the Massacre”
 “The Cabinet of Edgar Allan Poe”
 “Overture and Incidental Music for A Midsummer Night's Dream”
 “Peter and the Wolf”
 “The Kitchen Child”
 “The Fall River Axe Murders”

References

1985 short story collections
Short story collections by Angela Carter
Chatto & Windus books
Cultural depictions of Edgar Allan Poe
Cultural depictions of Lizzie Borden